The Catholic Church in Kuwait is part of the worldwide Catholic Church, under the spiritual leadership of the Pope in Rome.

There are over 140,000 Catholics in the country – representing about 6% of the population.

There are no dioceses in the country, but Kuwait falls under the Apostolic Vicariate of Northern Arabia.  The superior was the Italian bishop Camillo Ballin until his death on April 12, 2020.

There is a cathedral in Kuwait City dedicated to the Holy Family. However, this church is now a co-cathedral with the Cathedral of Our Lady of Arabia in Bahrain.

The other parishes are St. Thérèse Parish, Salmiya, Our Lady of Arabia Parish, Ahmadi and St. Daniel Comboni Parish, Jleeb Al-Shuyoukh. In 2002, the Salesian religious order started an English language school in the country.

There are also some churches belonging to the Eastern Catholic Church: the Syro-Malankara Catholic Community, Syro-Malabar Holy Family Cathedral Parish, and the Patriarchal Vicariate of Kuwait which belongs to the Melkite Catholic Patriarchate of Antioch.

References

External links
Statistics relating to the Catholic Church in Kuwait
Homepage of the Catholic Church in Kuwait
Photo of the cathedral

 
Kuwait
Kuwait
Apostolic Vicariate of Northern Arabia
Catholic Church in the Arabian Peninsula